Rosch may refer to:

 Brion Nuda Rosch (born 1976), American interactive and performance artist
 Eleanor Rosch (born 1938), American cognitive psychologist and university professor
 J. Thomas Rosch (1939–2016), American lawyer specializing in antitrust and trade regulatory laws

See also
 Rösch, a surname